Helleborus lividus is a species of flowering plant in the family Ranunculaceae, native to Majorca and possibly nearby Cabrera, Spain. The Latin lividus refers to the colour of the leaves (literally "lead-grey"). It may be best grown in a greenhouse in frost-prone areas. Propagation is from seed.

In cultivation it hybridises readily with the closely related H. argutifolius.

References

Flora, The Gardener's Bible, ABC Publishing, Ultimo, NSW, Australia, 2005
The Ultimate Plant Book, CSIRO Publishing, Collingwood, Vic, Australia, 2006
 Helleborus lividus on Groweris

lividus
Flora of the Balearic Islands
Endemic flora of Spain
Plants described in 1789
Garden plants of Europe
Perennial plants